8th Street is a station on the Hudson–Bergen Light Rail (HBLR) in the city of Bayonne, Hudson County, New Jersey. The southernmost stop in Bayonne, 8th Street station serves as the southern terminus of the Hudson–Bergen Light Rail. Located on an elevated track next to Route 440, the station is accessible at the intersection of Avenue C and West 8th Street. The station, unlike the rest of the line, has a full station depot that doubles as accessibility to tracks per the Americans with Disabilities Act of 1990. The depot is two stories high and contains elevators and access to the platform, which is an island platform with two tracks. East of the station, the tracks merge into one to reach 22nd Street station. The station serves tracks for the local service to Hoboken Terminal along with an express service known as the Bayonne Flyer. The station opened on January 31, 2011 as an extension of service from 22nd Street.

The design of the 8th Street station depot is a similar design to the former West 8th Street station on the Central Railroad of New Jersey that served Bayonne from August 1, 1864–August 6, 1978, when Conrail discontinued service.

History

The station is located in the Bergen Point neighborhood of Bayonne. It was once served by a stop on the Central Railroad of New Jersey's main line, as trains made their way from the main CNJ terminal in Jersey City to points in New Jersey and Pennsylvania. This ended in 1967 when CNJ passenger service was diverted to Newark Penn Station as part of the Aldene Plan. Shuttle service from 8th Street ran south across the CRRNJ Newark Bay Bridge and continued until August 6, 1978. The headhouse is reminiscent of the earlier station. Baltimore and Ohio passenger trains passed through until its passenger operations northeast of Baltimore ceased operation in 1958.

On April 18, 2008, NJ Transit awarded a $58.4 million contract to George Harms Company to begin the process of extending the line to 8th Street from 22nd Street. This contract paid for foundations, viaducts, tracks and a new station building. The extension follows the Conrail right of way along Avenue E; a viaduct was constructed to take the trains above local streets to a station served by an elevator and stairs. Ground was broken for the station on October 15, 2008. Originally scheduled to open in late 2010, the new station opened January 31, 2011.

Nearby attractions
 The nearby Bayonne Community Museum at 9th street and Broadway is currently under construction.
Bergen Point and Kill Van Kull Park

Staten Island connection
An extension of Hudson-Bergen Light Rail from 8th Street to the south would likely continue to Staten Island (with connection to the Staten Island light rail over the Bayonne Bridge.  The raising of the bridge does not exclude a future light rail.

Since 2015 studies have been underway to connect the station to Staten Island via an aerial tramway or gondola lift.

Station layout

References

Bibliography

External links

Transportation in Bayonne, New Jersey
Hudson-Bergen Light Rail stations
Railway stations in the United States opened in 2011
2011 establishments in New Jersey
Former Central Railroad of New Jersey stations